Hijli College is an undergraduate,  coeducational college situated in Hijli, near Kharagpur, Paschim Medinipur, and West Bengal. It was established in the year 1995. The college is under Vidyasagar University. Hijli College started functioning from August 1995. Bounded by the vastly stretched forests of sal, Akashmoni and Eucalyptus on one side, the college is situated in the midst of the green meadow of Kuchlachati, about 1.5 km from the eastern side of the Prembazar Health Center.

Departments

Science

Chemistry (Hons)
Physics
Mathematics (Hons)
Computer Science

Arts

Bengali (Hons)
English (Hons)
Sanskrit
History (Hons)
Geography (Hons)
Sociology (Hons)
Philosophy
Economics
Political Science

Self Finance Course
 BCA

Accreditation
Recently, Hijli College has been re-accredited and awarded C+ grade by the National Assessment and Accreditation Council (NAAC). The college is recognized by the University Grants Commission (UGC).

See also
Kharagpur College

References

External links
Hijli College
Vidyasagar University
University Grants Commission
National Assessment and Accreditation Council

Universities and colleges in Paschim Medinipur district
Colleges affiliated to Vidyasagar University
Educational institutions established in 1995
1995 establishments in West Bengal